Jenelle Porter is an American art curator and author of numerous exhibition catalogs and essays about contemporary art and craft. She has curated important exhibitions that have helped studio craft to gain acceptance as fine arts. These include the exhibitions Dirt on Delight: Impulses That Form Clay (co-curated with Ingrid Schaffner) at the Institute of Contemporary Art, Philadelphia in 2009 and Fiber: Sculpture 1960–Present at the Institute of Contemporary Art, Boston in 2014.

Education
She obtained her BA in Art history from Barnard College, Columbia University in 1994, and went on to obtain an MA in Critical and Curatorial Studies from University of California, Los Angeles in 2004.

Curatorial positions 
 2015–present Independent curator, Los Angeles
 2011–2015 Senior Curator, Institute of Contemporary Art, Boston
 2005–11 Curator, Institute of Contemporary Art, Philadelphia
 1998–2001 Curator, Artists Space, New York
 1997–98 Curatorial Fellow, Walker Art Center, Minneapolis
 1994–97Curatorial Assistant, Whitney Museum of American Art, New York

Selected exhibitions/curatorial activities 
2021 

Kay Sekimachi: Geometries, Berkeley Art Museum and Pacific Film Archive, California. 
 
2019 

Less is A Bore: Maximalist Art & Design, Institute of Contemporary Art Boston 

Mike Kelley: Timeless Painting, Hauser & Wirth, New York 

2017 

A Line Can Go Anywhere, James Cohan Gallery, New York 

2016 
 Beverly Center Renovation Installation Projects, in associated with the Hammer Museum. Featuring a series of installation projects by artists Catherine Opie, Liz Larner, Julian Hoeber, Geoff McFetridge, Karen Kimmel, Sharon Lockhart, Barbara Kruger, Ed Fella, Tanya Aguiñiga, Amanda Ross-Ho, Harsh Patel, Lisa Anne Auerbach, Gary Simmons, Dave Muller, and Pae White. 
2015 
Erin Shirreff, ICA Boston
Arlene Schechet: All at Once

2014
Fiber Sculpture, 1960–present, Institute of Contemporary Art Boston
Nick Cave
Matthew Ritchie, Institute of Contemporary Art Boston

2013

Christina Ramberg, Institute of Contemporary Art Boston

Jeffrey Gibson, Institute of Contemporary Art Boston

Mary Reid Kelley, Institute of Contemporary Art Boston

2012
Figuring Color: Kathy Butterfly, Felix Gonzalez-Torres, Roy McMakin, Sue Williams, Institute of Contemporary Art Boston
Dianna Molzan, Grand Tourist, Institute of Contemporary Art Boston

2011
Jessica Jackson Hutchins, Institute of Contemporary Art Boston
Charline von Heyl

2010
Mineral Spirits: Anne Chu and Matthew Monahan

2009
Dance with Camera
Dirt on Delight: Impulses that Form Clay
2008

Trisha Donnelly, Institute of Contemporary Art, Philadelphia

2007

Jay Heikes, Institute of Contemporary Art, Philadelphia

2006

Gone Formalism, Institute of Contemporary Art, Philadelphia

Reviews of exhibitions 
 The 2015 show "Arlene Schechet, All at Once" is praised for "giv[ing] readers a holistic look at how her work challenges the conventions of ceramics and sculpture."

Selected publications

References

Living people
American art curators
American women curators
Barnard College alumni
University of California, Los Angeles alumni
21st-century American non-fiction writers
21st-century American women writers
Year of birth missing (living people)